Resaca de la Palma State Park is one of three state parks belonging to the World Birding Center and managed by the Texas Parks and Wildlife Department.  At 1,200 acres, Resaca de la Palma State Park is the largest of the World Birding Center sites and is located in Brownsville. The property was acquired by the Texas Parks and Wildlife Department in 1977 and was opened to the public in December 2008. A resaca is a type of oxbow lake that can be found in Texas, and is a former channels of the Rio Grande. It is naturally cut off from the river, having no inlet or outlet.

World Birding Center
The World Birding Center is a partnership between the Texas Parks and Wildlife Department, U.S. Fish and Wildlife Service, and nine Rio Grande Valley communities.  The center is dedicated to increasing the appreciation, understanding, and conservation of birds and other wildlife and their habitat. The center promotes the conservation and restoration of native woodland and wetland habitats along the lower Rio Grande. These habitats support diverse flora and fauna, including several endangered species as well as species occurring nowhere else in the United States.  The World Birding Center's nine sites are located throughout Cameron, Hidalgo, and Starr counties.

Recreational activities
The primary recreational activity at Resaca de la Palma State Park is birdwatching.  The park offers several trails for hiking and biking, a tram tour, observation decks, and a butterfly garden.  The visitor center includes a state park store, as well as a meeting room. Private vehicles are prohibited within the park. Resaca de la Palma's various trails are accessible by foot, bike, and tram.

See also
List of Texas state parks
Rio Grande Valley
World Birding Center

References

External links 
 Resaca de la Palma State Park
 World Birding Center

State parks of Texas
Protected areas of Cameron County, Texas
Brownsville, Texas